Vladimir Yevgenyevich Krutov (1 June 1960 – 6 June 2012), nicknamed "The Tank", was a Soviet ice hockey forward. Together with Igor Larionov and Sergei Makarov, he was part of the famed KLM Line. He is considered one of the best hockey wingers of the 1980s.

For the Soviet Union national team, Krutov won the 1981 Canada Cup, two golds (1984, 1988) and one silver (1980) in the Olympics, and five golds (1981, 1982, 1983, 1986, 1989), one silver (1987), and one bronze (1985) in the World Championships.

On the club level, Krutov played for CSKA Moscow from 1978 to 1989. He was one of the first Soviet players to make the jump to the NHL, doing so with the Vancouver Canucks in 1989. However, Krutov did not have a successful season, battling homesickness and weight problems.

Krutov left the NHL after his lone season in North America and played for several clubs in the Swiss and the Swedish leagues before retiring to move into coaching. His son Alexei Krutov is a former hockey player who played professionally from 1999 to 2017.

In 2010, he was inducted into the International Ice Hockey Federation Hall of Fame.

Krutov died in a hospital in Moscow on 6 June 2012, of internal bleeding and liver failure, just five days after his 52nd birthday.

Career statistics

Regular season and playoffs

International

References

External links

1960 births
2012 deaths
Ice hockey people from Moscow
HC CSKA Moscow players
Ice hockey players at the 1980 Winter Olympics
Ice hockey players at the 1984 Winter Olympics
Ice hockey players at the 1988 Winter Olympics
IIHF Hall of Fame inductees
Olympic ice hockey players of the Soviet Union
Olympic gold medalists for the Soviet Union
Olympic medalists in ice hockey
Olympic silver medalists for the Soviet Union
Honoured Masters of Sport of the USSR
Recipients of the Order of Friendship of Peoples
Recipients of the Order of the Red Banner of Labour
Recipients of the Order of Honour (Russia)
Russian ice hockey left wingers
Soviet expatriate ice hockey players
Soviet expatriate sportspeople in Canada
Soviet ice hockey left wingers
Vancouver Canucks draft picks
Vancouver Canucks players
ZSC Lions players
Medalists at the 1984 Winter Olympics
Medalists at the 1988 Winter Olympics
Medalists at the 1980 Winter Olympics
Deaths from bleeding
Deaths from liver failure
Expatriate ice hockey players in Canada
Russian expatriate sportspeople in Switzerland
Russian expatriate sportspeople in Sweden
Russian expatriate ice hockey people
Expatriate ice hockey players in Sweden
Expatriate ice hockey players in Switzerland